Welton Gite is a bass guitarist, composer and arranger.

Gite moved to New Orleans at age 11 and began playing bass at the age of 12. He moved to Los Angeles in 1975 and began his 53-year road/studio musician journey, touring with many artists from all genres of music, such as Marvin Gaye, Marlena Shaw, Billy Preston, Willie Bobo, Ronnie and Hubert Laws, Alphonse Mouzon, The Jacksons, Cheryl Lynn, Luther Vandross, Thelma Houston, Sister Sledge, Shalamar, John Kay & Steppenwolf and many others.

References 

1956 births
Living people
American bass guitarists
American male composers
20th-century American composers
Steppenwolf (band) members
20th-century American guitarists
American male bass guitarists